Ignazio Battista (born 8 March 1997) is an Italian football player who plays for Us Città di Fasano.

Club career
He made his Serie B debut for Ternana on 7 September 2016 in a game against Pisa.

On 31 January 2020, he signed a contract with Vibonese until the end of the 2019–20 season, with an option to extend it for the next season.

References

External links
 

1997 births
Sportspeople from Taranto
Living people
Italian footballers
Association football forwards
Taranto F.C. 1927 players
Ternana Calcio players
U.S. Viterbese 1908 players
Matera Calcio players
A.S. Gubbio 1910 players
U.S. Vibonese Calcio players
S.E.F. Torres 1903 players
Serie B players
Serie C players
Serie D players